Red Touch Media is a software technology company that specializes in white label content management and distribution solutions. Red Touch Media currently has operations in Salt Lake City, London, Liverpool, Cape Town, New York City and Los Angeles. Wayne Scholes is the CEO.

About
Red Touch Media is headquartered in Salt Lake City, Utah, and specializes in digital content management via a multi-purpose distribution platform. The company creates websites, apps and kiosks that enable partners to distribute digital entertainment content to consumers. It also provides analytics to retailers and content providers.
Red Touch Media's network manages more than 2 billion files each month including TV shows, movies, ebooks, games, software and music.

As of 2013, Red Touch serves more than 3 million consumers worldwide.

Alumni Staff
 Jesse Redniss Advisory Board
 Frank Radice Advisory Board
 Jon Accarrino VP of Marketing, Interim CMO

References 

Software companies based in Utah
Software companies of the United States
2001 establishments in Utah